Eremophila laccata is a flowering plant in the figwort family, Scrophulariaceae and is endemic to an area near Carnegie in Western Australia. It is a small, low, spindly shrub with scattered, linear leaves, and pink, flattened bell-shaped flowers.

Description
The branches are glabrous and sticky with resin.

The petal tube is pink to pinkish white and both the inner and outer surfaces are hairy. The 4 stamens are enclosed in the petal tube. Flowering time is mainly between June and September, but may occur at other times if conditions are favourable. The fruit are oval, shiny and glabrous.

Taxonomy and naming
Eremophila laccata was first formally described by Bevan Buirchell and Andrew Phillip Brown in 2016 and the description was published in Nuytsia. The specific epithet (laccata) is a Latin word meaning "appearing varnished" referring to the smooth, shiny fruit.

Distribution and habitat
This eremophila is only known from near the Canning Stock Route in the Gascoyne and Little Sandy Desert biogeographic regions where in shallow red-brown soil in mulga.

Conservation status
Eremophila laccata is only known from a few scattered populations and has been classified as "Priority One" by the Western Australian Government Department of Parks and Wildlife meaning that it is known from only one or a few locations which are potentially at risk.

References

laccata
Eudicots of Western Australia
Plants described in 2016
Taxa named by Bevan Buirchell
Taxa named by Andrew Phillip Brown